Jørundur Skógdrívsson (or Jørund Skogdrivsson), was, from 1479 to 1524, the lawman (prime minister) of the Faroe Islands.

References
Løgtingið 150 - Hátíðarrit. Tórshavn 2002, Bind 2, S. 366. (Avsnitt Føroya løgmenn fram til 1816) (PDF-Download)

Lawmen of the Faroe Islands
15th-century Norwegian people
16th-century Norwegian people
16th-century heads of government
Year of birth unknown
Year of death unknown